Åke Rydberg (born 3 September 1938) is a retired Swedish professional ice hockey player and footballer. Rydberg was part of the Djurgården Swedish champions' team of 1958, 1959, 1960, 1961, 1962, and 1963.

References

Swedish footballers
Swedish ice hockey players
Allsvenskan players
Djurgårdens IF Fotboll players
Djurgårdens IF Hockey players
1938 births
Living people
Association footballers not categorized by position
People from Kalmar
Sportspeople from Kalmar County